Nadja Furrer (born 30 April 1998) is a Swiss footballer who plays as a goalkeeper for Grasshoppers and the Switzerland national team.

International career
Furrer made her debut for the Switzerland national team on 4 March 2019, as a starter against Portugal.

References

1998 births
Living people
Women's association football goalkeepers
Swiss women's footballers
Switzerland women's international footballers
Grasshopper Club Zürich (women) players
Footballers from Zürich
Swiss Women's Super League players